Mindy Smith is the fifth album by country and folk artist Mindy Smith. This is Smith's first independently released album.

Track listing

Personnel
 Mindy Smith – vocals, casio SK-1
 Jason Lehning – B3, piano, Roland Juno-60, electric guitar, organ, percussion, mellotron
 Bryan Sutton – acoustic guitars, mandolin, banjo, bouzouki, tenor guitar
 Joe Pisapia – electric guitars, acoustic guitar
 Dan Dugmore – pedal steel guitar, electric guitar
 Lex Price – acoustic guitar, bass
 Ian Fitchuk – drums, percussion
 Kate York – backing vocals
 Sarah Siskind – backing vocals
 Julie Lee – backing vocals
 Daniel Tashian – backing vocals

Production
 Producer: Jason Lehning and Mindy Smith
 Mixing: Jason Lehning and Paul Bowman
 Mastering: Jim DeMain
 Photography and Design: Fairlight Hubbard / Eye
 Paintings, prints, and keepsakes: Mindy Smith

References

Mindy Smith albums
2012 albums